Andy Baird (born 18 January 1979) is a Scottish former professional footballer, who played in the Football League for Wycombe Wanderers.

Baird was born in East Kilbride, Scotland, but began his professional career in England as a trainee with Wycombe Wanderers. He made his debut on 25 April 1998, whilst still a trainee, coming on as a late substitute for Mark Stallard in the 1–1 draw at home to Chesterfield.

He turned professional the following summer and soon established himself in the first team. However, a series of injuries later restricted his appearances and in the summer of 2002 he was released by the club because he was too prone to injuries.

He joined Brackley Town where he found that a first team place was hard to come by. However, in 2005 he joined Banbury United where he has become an integral member of the team. In 2008, he transferred to Oxford City. He is capable of playing at centre forward or centre back.

References

1979 births
Banbury United F.C. players
Living people
Sportspeople from East Kilbride
Scottish footballers
English Football League players
Wycombe Wanderers F.C. players
Footballers from South Lanarkshire
Brackley Town F.C. players
Oxford City F.C. players
Association football central defenders
Association football forwards